The J. J. Sakurai Prize for Theoretical Particle Physics, is presented by the American Physical Society at its annual April Meeting, and honors outstanding achievement in particle physics theory. The prize consists of a monetary award (US$10,000), a certificate citing the contributions recognized by the award, and a travel allowance for the recipient to attend the presentation. The award is endowed by the family and friends of particle physicist J. J. Sakurai. The prize has been awarded annually since 1985.

Prize recipients
The following have won this prize:

 2023 Heinrich Leutwyler: "For fundamental contributions to the effective field theory of pions at low energies, and for proposing that the gluon is a color octet."
 2022 Nima Arkani-Hamed: "For the development of transformative new frameworks for physics beyond the standard model with novel experimental signatures, including work on large extra dimensions, the little Higgs, and more generally for new ideas connected to the origin of the electroweak scale."
 2021 Vernon Barger: "For pioneering work in collider physics contributing to the discovery and characterization of the W boson, top quark, and Higgs boson, and for the development of incisive strategies to test theoretical ideas with experiments."
 2020 Pierre Sikivie: "For seminal work recognizing the potential visibility of the invisible axion, devising novel methods to detect it, and for theoretical investigations of its cosmological implications."
 2019 Lisa Randall and Raman Sundrum: "For creative contributions to physics beyond the Standard Model, in particular the discovery that warped extra dimensions of space can solve the hierarchy puzzle, which has had a tremendous impact on searches at the Large Hadron Collider."
 2018 Ann Nelson and Michael Dine: "For groundbreaking explorations of physics beyond the standard model of particle physics, including their seminal joint work on dynamical super-symmetry breaking, and for their innovative contributions to a broad range of topics, including new models of electroweak symmetry breaking, baryogenesis, and solutions to the strong charge parity problem."
 2017 Gordon L. Kane, Howard E. Haber, Jack F. Gunion and Sally Dawson: "For instrumental contributions to the theory of the properties, reactions, and signatures of the Higgs boson."
 2016 G. Peter Lepage: "For inventive applications of quantum field theory to particle physics, particularly in establishing the theory of hadronic exclusive processes, developing nonrelativistic effective field theories, and determining standard-model parameters with lattice gauge theory."
 2015 George Zweig: "For his independent proposal that hadrons are composed of fractionally charged fundamental constituents, called quarks or aces, and for developing its revolutionary implications for hadron masses and properties."
 2014 Zvi Bern, Lance J. Dixon, and David A. Kosower: "For pathbreaking contributions to the calculation of perturbative scattering amplitudes, which led to a deeper understanding of quantum field theory and to powerful new tools for computing QCD processes."
 2013 Helen Quinn and Roberto Peccei:  "For their proposal of the elegant mechanism to resolve the famous problem of strong-CP violation which, in turn, led to the invention of axions, a subject of intense experimental and theoretical investigation for more than three decades."
 2012 Guido Altarelli, Torbjörn Sjöstrand, and Bryan Webber.  "For key ideas leading to the detailed confirmation of the Standard Model of particle physics, enabling high energy experiments to extract precise information about Quantum Chromodynamics, electroweak interactions and possible new physics."
 2011 Chris Quigg, Estia Eichten, Ian Hinchliffe, and Kenneth Lane:  "For their work, separately and collectively, to chart a course of the exploration of TeV scale physics using multi-TeV hadron colliders."
 2010 Gerald Guralnik, C. R. Hagen, Tom Kibble, Robert Brout, Francois Englert, and Peter Higgs: "For elucidation of the properties of spontaneous symmetry breaking in four-dimensional relativistic gauge theory and of the mechanism for the consistent generation of vector boson masses."  See also 1964 PRL symmetry breaking papers, Higgs mechanism, and Higgs boson.
 2009 Davison E. Soper, John C. Collins and R. Keith Ellis: "For work in perturbative Quantum Chromodynamics, including applications to problems pivotal to the interpretation of high energy particle collisions"
 2008 Alexei Smirnov and Stanislav Mikheyev: "For pioneering and influential work on the enhancement of neutrino oscillations in matter, which is essential to a quantitative understanding of the solar neutrino flux"
 2007 Stanley Brodsky: "For applications of perturbative quantum field theory to critical questions of elementary particle physics, in particular, to the analysis of hard exclusive strong interaction processes"
 2006 Savas Dimopoulos: "For his creative ideas on dynamical symmetry breaking, supersymmetry, and extra spatial dimensions, which have shaped theoretical research on TeV-scale physics, thereby inspiring a wide range of experiments"
 2005 Susumu Okubo: For groundbreaking investigations into the pattern of hadronic masses and decay rates, which provided essential clues into the development of the quark model, and for demonstrating that CP violation permits partial decay rate asymmetries"
 2004 Ikaros Bigi and Anthony Ichiro Sanda: For pioneering theoretical insights that pointed the way to the very fruitful experimental study of CP violation in B decays, and for continuing contributions to the fields of CP and heavy flavor physics"
 2003 Alfred Mueller and George Sterman: "For developing concepts and techniques in QCD, such as infrared safety and factorization in hard processes, which permitted precise quantitative predictions and experimental tests, and thereby helped to establish QCD as the theory of the strong interactions"
 2002 William Marciano and Alberto Sirlin: "For their pioneering work on radiative corrections, which made precision electroweak studies a powerful method of probing the Standard Model and searching for new physics"
 2001 Nathan Isgur, Mikhail Voloshin, Mark Wise: "For the construction of the heavy quark mass expansion and the discovery of the heavy quark symmetry in quantum chromodynamics, which led to a quantitative theory of the decays of c and b flavored hadrons"
 2000 Curtis Callan: "For his classic formulation of the renormalization group, his contributions to instanton physics and to the theory of monopoles and strings"
 1999 Mikhail Shifman, Arkady Vainshtein, and : "For fundamental contributions to the understanding of non-perturbative QCD, non-leptonic weak decays, and the analytic properties of supersymmetric gauge theories"
 1998 Leonard Susskind: "For his pioneering contributions to hadronic string models, lattice gauge theories, quantum chromodynamics, and dynamical symmetry breaking"
 1997 Thomas Appelquist: "For his pioneering work on charmonium and on the de-coupling of heavy particles"
 1996 William A. Bardeen: "For fundamental insights into the structure and meaning of the axial anomaly and for contributions to the understanding of perturbative quantum chromodynamics"
 1995 Howard Georgi: "For his pioneering contributions toward the unification of strong and electroweak interactions, and for his application of quantum chromodynamics to the properties and interactions of hadrons"
 1994 Yoichiro Nambu: "For his many fundamental contributions to field theory and particle physics, including the understanding of the pion as the signaler of spontaneous breaking of chiral symmetry"
 1993 Mary K. Gaillard: "For contributions to particle physics phenomenology and theory, and in particular for her work with Ben Lee and others applying QCD to K meson mixing and decays and to the bound states of charmed quarks"
 1992 Lincoln Wolfenstein: "For his many contributions to the theory of weak interactions, particularly CP violation and the properties of neutrinos"
 1991 Vladimir Gribov: "For his early pioneering work on the high energy behavior of quantum field theories and his elucidating studies of the global structure of non-abelian gauge theories"
 1990 Toichiro Kinoshita: "For his theoretical contributions to precision tests of quantum electrodynamics and the electroweak theory, especially his pioneering work on the computation of the lepton anomalous magnetic moments"
 1989 Nicola Cabibbo: "For his outstanding contribution in elucidating the structure of the hadronic weak current"
 1988 Stephen L. Adler: "For his work in elucidating the consequences of chiral symmetry through sum rules and low energy theorems"
 1987 Luciano Maiani and John Iliopoulos: "For their work on the weak interactions of charmed particles, a crucial step in the development of the modern theory of the fundamental interactions"
 1986 David Gross, H. David Politzer, and Frank Wilczek: "For their analyses of nonabelian gauge theories at short distances, and the implications of these insights for the understanding of the strong interaction between quarks"
 1985 Toshihide Maskawa and Makoto Kobayashi: "For their contributions to the theory of electroweak interactions through their general formulation of fermion mass matrix and their prescient inference of the existence of more than four flavors of quarks"

See also

 List of physics awards
 List of awards named after people

References

External links
 J. J. Sakurai Prize for Theoretical Particle Physics (official site)
 2010 Sakurai Prize Videos

Awards of the American Physical Society
Fellows of the American Physical Society